This is a list of notable people from Saint John, New Brunswick. Although not everyone in this list was born in Saint John, they all live or have lived in Saint John and have had significant connections to the community.

See also
List of people from New Brunswick

References

 
Saint John, New Brunswick
Saint John